The Dogs (Fouling of Land) Act 1996 is an Act of the Parliament of the United Kingdom. The purpose of the Act was to create a criminal offence if a dog defecates at any time on designated land and a person who is in charge of the dog at that time fails to remove the faeces from the land forthwith.

It was repealed by Clean Neighbourhoods and Environment Act 2005 section 65, and replaced by similar legislation in the same act. The Act applied only in England and Wales. It was not regulated in Scotland until the passing of the Dog Fouling (Scotland) Act 2003.

Some exemptions are in place for land beside a major road, agricultural land or forestry. Local authorities were to be responsible for policing the Act, and are able to appoint officers to enforce the regulations. Conviction would lead to a fine.

See also
Dogs Act

References

External links

Bibliography
 Wells DL (2006). Factors influencing owners' reactions to their dogs' fouling. Environ Behav ;38:707–14.

1996 in the environment
United Kingdom Acts of Parliament 1996
Dog law in the United Kingdom
Waste legislation in the United Kingdom
Animal welfare and rights legislation in the United Kingdom